Embūte Parish is an administrative unit of South Kurzeme Municipality in the Courland region of Latvia. The parish has a population of 414 (as of 1/07/2010) and covers an area of 117.6 km2.

Villages of Embūte parish 
 Dēsele
 Dinsdurbe
 Embūte
 Vībiņi

See also 
 Embūte castle

References

Parishes of Latvia
South Kurzeme Municipality
Courland